Karl Wittenberg was a German swimmer who specialized in the 200 m breaststroke. In this event he won the national title and a silver medal at the European Championships in 1931.

References

Year of birth missing
Possibly living people
German male swimmers
German male breaststroke swimmers
20th-century German people